The 1955 Singapore Open, also known as the 1955 Singapore Badminton Championships, took place from 4 October – 22 November 1955 at the Singapore Badminton Hall in Singapore. The ties were played over a few months with the first round ties being played on the 4th of October and the last (mixed doubles final) was played on the 22nd of November.

In the same year, Wee Kim Wee was elected as the president of SBA and he promised to look into the opening of existing annual championships to overseas players, i.e., that of All-England and U.S. championships after a proposal raised by an association member was turned down by the previous committee.

Venue
Singapore Badminton Hall

Final results

References 

Singapore Open (badminton)
1955 in badminton